Alton Ray Corbin (born February 12, 1949) is an American former Major League Baseball pitcher who appeared in 181 games for the Minnesota Twins from  to .

Born in Live Oak, Florida, Corbin signed with the Twins out of high school as an amateur free agent prior to the 1967 season; he attended Florida Gateway College and North Florida Community College. He made his major league debut on opening day April 6, 1971, pitching the final two innings in relief during a 7–2 loss to the Milwaukee Brewers.

Corbin served as both a starter (63 starts, 12 complete games, three shutouts) and reliever (62 games finished, 17 saves) during his five MLB seasons, all with the Twins, compiling a 36–38 won–lost record and a career 3.84 earned run average. He allowed 638 hits and 261 bases on balls, with 348 strikeouts, in 652 innings pitched.

References

External links

1949 births
Living people
Baseball players from Florida
Charlotte Hornets (baseball) players
Gulf Coast Twins players
Major League Baseball pitchers
Minnesota Twins players
Orlando Twins players
People from Live Oak, Florida
Red Springs Twins players